Dam-e Tang-e Bavary (also Romanized as Dam-e Tang-e Bāvary; also known as Dam-e Tang) is a village in Kabgian Rural District, Kabgian District, Dana County, Kohgiluyeh and Boyer-Ahmad Province, Iran. At the 2006 census, its population was 41, in 7 families.

References 

Populated places in Dana County